The Prince William County Department of Parks, Recreation & Tourism is responsible for developing and maintaining the various parks, historical sites, and recreational areas owned by Prince William County, Virginia. The Department manages nearly 4,000 acres (16 km²) of park land and recreational facilities.

History
The Prince William County Park Authority was founded in 1977 by the Prince William Board of County Supervisors to provide the residents and visitors with recreational programs, parks and facilities until Prince William Board of County Supervisors dissolved Park Authority and created a new Prince William County Department of Parks & Recreation as of July 1, 2012.

Operations
The Prince William County Department of Parks & Recreation over operates 50 Parks, 2 Water Parks, 2 Fitness & Aquatic Recreation Centers (Chinn Aquatics & Fitness Center and Sharron Baucom Dale City Recreation Center), 2 Community Centers, 6 Sports Complexes, 2 Skate Parks, 1 Dog Park, 2 18-Hole Golf Courses & Mini Golf, Outdoor community pools, Marina Facilities & Fishing, Tennis, Racquetball & Basketball Courts, Batting Cages and over 50 miles of trails, greenways & water trails.

The headquarters is in the Hellwig Administration Building in Manassas, VA.

Parks and Recreation Commission 
The Parks Commission acts as an advisory body to the Board of County Supervisors on issues pertaining to parks and recreation, for the citizens of Prince William County.  The Commission has eight members, appointed by the Board of County Supervisors, one member to represent their respective district, and one “At-Large” member appointed by the chairman of the Board of County Supervisors.
 At - Large George Delimba 
 Brentsville District Erica Tredinnick
 Coles District Jane Beyer 
 Gainesville District Jeffery Bergman (Vice Chairman)
 Neabsco District Nate Murphy
 Occoquan District Brodie Freer (Chairman)
 Potomac District David Miles
 Woodbridge District Sharon Richardson
 Secretary to The Commission Shannon Jaenicke

See also
Splash Down Waterpark, a waterpark in Manassas.

References

External links
 Official Website of Prince William County Department of Parks & Recreation
 Official Website of Prince William County Government

Prince William County, Virginia
County government agencies in Virginia
County parks departments in the United States
2012 establishments in Virginia